The Freshwater River is the longest river on Stewart Island, the third largest of New Zealand's islands. It arises close to the island's northwestern point, from which it is separated by a ridge, and flows southeastward through the Ruggedy Flat for  before reaching the Paterson Inlet on the island's central east coast. The Freshwater is the longest New Zealand river not to be located in either of the country's two main islands.

A tramping track runs along the lower reach of the river.

References

Rivers of Stewart Island